Onesimus, bishop of Byzantium (a runaway slave and early Christian convert mentioned in the New Testament of the Christian Bible).

Onesimus may also refer to:
 Onesimos (vase painter) (fl ca. 505 – ca. 480 BCE)
 Onesimus (son of Python), 2nd century Macedonian noble
 Onesimus of Soissons 4th century bishop and saint
 Onesimus of Kiev, 12-13th century Christian monk
 Onesimus (Bostonian) (1600s – 1700s), enslaved African man in Boston who advocated smallpox inoculation
 Onesimus Ustonson (1736 – ca 1783), British manufacturer of fishing tackle
 Onesimos Nesib (ca 1856 – 1931), translator of the Bible into the Ethiopian Oromo language
 Onesimus "Ness" Edwards (1897 – 1968), British politician
 Onesimus (1882), book by Edwin Abbott Abbott